Figma may refer to:

 Figma (software), a collaborative web-based vector editor and UX design tool
 Figma (toy), a Japanese action figure line from Max Factory
 FIGMA, the Finnish Games and Multimedia Association